Middle Fork State Fish and Wildlife Area is an Illinois state park on  in Vermilion County, Illinois, United States. Its name comes from the Middle Fork of the Vermilion River that flows through the area.

References

State parks of Illinois
Protected areas of Vermilion County, Illinois
Protected areas established in 1986
1986 establishments in Illinois